Phytoecia hirsutula is a species of beetle in the family Cerambycidae. It was described by Frölich in 1793, originally under the genus Saperda. It has a wide distribution between Europe and the Middle East.

Subspecies
 Phytoecia hirsutula obsoleta (Ganglbauer, 1888)
 Phytoecia hirsutula hirsutula (Frölich, 1793)
 Phytoecia hirsutula homoiesthes Ganglbauer, 1888

References

Phytoecia
Beetles described in 1793